Fridericia is a genus of annelids of the family Enchytraeidae. The genus was described in 1889 by Wilhelm Michaelsen.

References

Enchytraeidae